Dunfermline Upper railway station served the town of Dunfermline, Fife, Scotland from 1849 to 1968 on the Stirling and Dunfermline Railway.

History 
The station opened on 13 December 1849 by the Edinburgh and Glasgow Railway. To the north was the goods yard which had a large goods shed and sidings. There was also a locomotive shed to the east which was later replaced. The station had two signal boxes, one to the east and the other to the west which were opened in 1880. The east signal box was replaced in 1916 and it replaced the west signal box in 1927. The station's name was changed to Dunfermline Upper on 2 June 1890 to distinguish it from Dunfermline Lower. The station closed on 7 October 1968.

References

External links 

Disused railway stations in Fife
Railway stations in Great Britain opened in 1849
Railway stations in Great Britain closed in 1968
Beeching closures in Scotland
1849 establishments in Scotland
1968 disestablishments in Scotland
Former North British Railway stations